Emmanuel Chinenye Ugolee  (born October 4, 1975), is a Nigerian media personality, producer, voice over artist and author. He was born in Jos, Plateau state.

Early life and education

Ugolee was born in Jos, Plateau state, in central Nigeria in 1975. He hails from Isiala Ngwa North local government area of Abia State, in the south-eastern region of Nigeria. He got married on 13 September 2013 and got divorced in 2016.

Ugolee was diagnosed with level 5 of chronic kidney disease in 2011. He had a kidney transplant in 2012 February 22 in India. The transplant was not successful and so he inevitably returned to dialysis, a three time weekly treatment that keeps him alive in anticipation of another transplant. He is currently on the transplant wait list with Medstar Hospital in Baltimore, Maryland. USA, where he permanently resides.

Career
In 1999 while Ugolee was in the Enugu State University of Science and Technology, He had gone on a television talk show called Just Gisting on a television network known as Minaj Broadcast International to promote an upcoming school event called the ESUT Awards. The owner of the television station, Mike Ajegbo, was impressed by Ugolee. He was offered a job upon graduation. Ugolee had his first shot at broadcasting by becoming the host of the same show Just Gisting on which he was a guest a few months earlier. The most popular of the three shows was called The MBI Top 10 Countdown which was a brain child of Emmanuel and Nigeria's first ever all Ugolee music video countdown.  Nigerian celebrities like Sound Sultan, Ruggedman, Mode 9 and D'banj were pioneer beneficiaries from the show's popularity. At this point in his career, Ugolee attended the Federal Radio Corporation of Nigeria Training school for broadcasters in 2002.

In 2004 Ugolee joined Globacom as an executive in the marketing communications department. He produced and presented a TV show for the company called Glo Show. In 2011, he produced his first independent television talk show called The Gist. The Gist aired on HipTV from 2015 to early 2017 when it moved to the air on national TV Network of the AIT  where it is running till date. In 2018 Ugolee and his partner Ossy Achievas registered and launched the Nigerian Social Media Awards project which is designed to recognise and award outstanding Nigerians for an excellent use of social media.

In 2019, Ugolee authored his first book: A 100 Random Light Bulbs, a collection of musings, with the aim to inspire its readers to a deeper understanding of every day issues in life.

Awards and recognitions 
2002: Hip Hop World Magazine media personality of the year.
2006: nominated for the Future Awards Africa for young professional of the year 2006.

Bibliography
A 100 Random Light Bulbs. Design Africa Concept Limited (17 Nov. 2019).

See also
 List of Nigerian media personalities
 List of Igbo people

References

Living people
1975 births
People from Abia State
Nigerian media personalities
Nigerian television producers
People from Jos